Kenai may refer to:

Places
 Kenai, Alaska, a city in Kenai Peninsula Borough, Alaska
 Kenai Peninsula, a large peninsula in south-central Alaska
 Kenai River, a river on the Kenai Peninsula
 Kenai Mountains, a mountain range in Alaska
 Kenai Fjords National Park
 Kenai Municipal Airport
 Kenai National Wildlife Refuge

Organizations
 Kenai Peninsula Borough, the local government of the Peninsula and some surrounding areas
 Kenai Peninsula Borough School District
 Kenai Peninsula College, a unit of the University of Alaska Anchorage
 the Kenaitze tribe, a branch of the Dena'ina people and the original inhabitants of Kenai

Miscellaneous
 Kenai (Brother Bear), a Disney character
 Kenai, a song by Alaskan metalcore band 36 Crazyfists, from their album A Snow Capped Romance
 Kenai, a rugged tablet computer from Trimble Navigation